Elections to Fermanagh District Council were held on 19 May 1993 on the same day as the other Northern Irish local government elections. The election used four district electoral areas to elect a total of 23 councillors.

Election results

Note: "Votes" are the first preference votes.

Districts summary

|- class="unsortable" align="centre"
!rowspan=2 align="left"|Ward
! % 
!Cllrs
! % 
!Cllrs
! %
!Cllrs
! %
!Cllrs
! %
!Cllrs
!rowspan=2|TotalCllrs
|- class="unsortable" align="center"
!colspan=2 bgcolor="" | UUP
!colspan=2 bgcolor="" | Sinn Féin
!colspan=2 bgcolor="" | SDLP
!colspan=2 bgcolor="" | DUP
!colspan=2 bgcolor="white"| Others
|-
|align="left"|Enniskillen
|bgcolor="40BFF5"|47.6
|bgcolor="40BFF5"|3
|12.3
|1
|17.3
|1
|10.9
|1
|11.9
|1
|7
|-
|align="left"|Erne East
|bgcolor="40BFF5"|36.6
|bgcolor="40BFF5"|3
|25.5
|1
|17.0
|1
|5.2
|0
|15.7
|1
|6
|-
|align="left"|Erne North
|bgcolor="40BFF5"|42.9
|bgcolor="40BFF5"|2
|6.9
|1
|30.0
|2
|20.2
|1
|0.0
|0
|5
|-
|align="left"|Erne West
|bgcolor="40BFF5"|30.6
|bgcolor="40BFF5"|2
|22.2
|1
|15.1
|1
|3.0
|0
|29.1
|1
|5
|- class="unsortable" class="sortbottom" style="background:#C9C9C9"
|align="left"| Total
|39.5
|10
|19.3
|5
|17.1
|3
|9.5
|2
|14.6
|3
|23
|-
|}

District results

Enniskillen

1989: 3 x UUP, 1 x SDLP, 1 x Sinn Féin, 1 x DUP, 1 x Workers' Party
1993: 3 x UUP, 1 x SDLP, 1 x Sinn Féin, 1 x DUP, 1 x Independent Socialist
1989-1993 Change: Independent Socialist leaves Workers' Party

Erne East

1989: 3 x UUP, 2 x Sinn Féin, 1 x SDLP
1993: 3 x UUP, 1 x Sinn Féin, 1 x SDLP, 1 x Independent Nationalist
1989-1993 Change: Independent Nationalist gain from Sinn Féin

Erne North

1989: 2 x UUP, 2 x SDLP, 1 x DUP
1993: 2 x UUP, 2 x SDLP, 1 x DUP
1989-1993 Change: No change

Erne West

1989: 2 x UUP, 1 x Sinn Féin, 1 x SDLP, 1 x Independent Nationalist
1993: 2 x UUP, 1 x Sinn Féin, 1 x SDLP, 1 x Independent Nationalist
1989-1993 Change: No change

References

1993 Northern Ireland local elections
20th century in County Fermanagh
Fermanagh District Council elections